Blue Blazes is a 1936 American short comedy film directed by Raymond Kane and starring Buster Keaton.

Plot
Elmer (Buster Keaton) becomes a fireman, but not a particularly good one. He has a chance to prove himself, however, when three women are trapped in a burning building.

Cast
 Buster Keaton as Elmer
 Arthur L. Jarrett as Fire chief
 Marlyn Stuart as The chief's blonde daughter
 Rose Kessner as The chief's wife
 Patty Wilson as The chief's brunette daughter

See also
 List of American films of 1936
 Buster Keaton filmography

External links

 Blue Blazes at the International Buster Keaton Society

1936 films
1936 comedy films
1936 short films
American black-and-white films
American comedy short films
Films directed by Buster Keaton
Films about firefighting
Educational Pictures short films
1930s English-language films
1930s American films